Victor Adenuga Oyenuga, CFR (April 9, 1917 – April 10, 2010) was a Nigerian Professor Emeritus of Agricultural science and pioneer President of the Nigerian Academy of Science.
He was the first Emeritus Professor of the University of Ibadan.

Early life
Professor Oyenuga was born on April 9, 1917 at Isonyi, a town in the city of Ijebu Ode, Ogun State, southwestern Nigeria by late Thomas Oyenuga, a peasant farmer. He attended Emmanuel Primary School in Ado Ekiti, Emmanuel Primary School before he was admitted into Wasinmi African Church Secondary School, Ijebe Ode.

He proceeded to Durham University, Newcastle upon Tyne where he received a bachelor's degree in Agricultural chemistry in 1948 and doctorate degree in Agricultural biochemistry and Nutrition from the same university in 1951.
In 1977, he bagged an Honorary degree of Doctor of Science from Obafemi Awolowo University, the same year he was elected President of the Nigerian Academy of Science and in 1978, he was honored with a Doctor of Science degree by Durham University for his outstanding publications in reputable journals.

In 1996 he was honored with Doctor of science by Ogun State University in recognition of his immense contributions to Agricultural science.

Career
He began his career in 1935 as a classroom teacher at Teacher Anglican Church Mission, Ijebu. He later joined the University of Ibadan as an academic staff in the department of Animal Nutrition where he rose to the position of a Senior Lecturer in 1958, the same year he was appointed head of department agricultural chemistry, a position he held for three years.
In 1961, he became a Professor of Obafemi Awolowo University where he served as head of department of Agriculture.
In 1972, he was appointed Deputy Vice Chancellor of the University of Ibadan, a. Position he held 1976 and in 1979, he became the first Emeritus Professor of the University of Ibadan.
In 1992, he was appointed a Pro-Chancellor and Chairman Governing Council, University of Port Harcourt.

Personal life

Marriage and family 
On April 11, 1950 Victor Adenuga Oyenuga married Sabinah Babafunmike Oyenuga (Nee Onabajo). They had five (5) children, three sons and two daughters.

Fellowships
Fellow, Nigerian Academy of Science
Fellow, Royal Society of Chemistry
Fellow, Royal Institute of Chemistry

References

1917 births
2010 deaths
Fellows of the Nigerian Academy of Science
Nigerian agriculturalists
People from Ijebu Ode
Nigerian schoolteachers
Academic staff of the University of Ibadan
Academic staff of Obafemi Awolowo University
University of Port Harcourt people
Alumni of King's College, Newcastle
Fellows of the African Academy of Sciences